Classical Nahuatl (also known simply as Aztec or Nahuatl) is any of the variants of Nahuatl spoken in the Valley of Mexico and central Mexico as a lingua franca at the time of the 16th-century Spanish conquest of the Aztec Empire. During the subsequent centuries, it was largely displaced by Spanish and evolved into some of the modern Nahuan languages in use today (other modern dialects descend more directly from other 16th-century variants). Although classified as an extinct language, Classical Nahuatl has survived through a multitude of written sources transcribed by Nahua peoples and Spaniards in the Latin script.

Classification
Classical Nahuatl is one of the Nahuan languages within the Uto-Aztecan family. It is classified as a central dialect and is most closely related to the modern dialects of Nahuatl spoken in the valley of Mexico in colonial and modern times. It is probable that the Classical Nahuatl documented by 16th- and 17th-century written sources represents a particularly prestigious sociolect. That is to say, the variety of Nahuatl recorded in these documents is most likely to be more particularly representative of the speech of Aztec nobles (pīpiltin), while the commoners (mācēhualtin) spoke a somewhat different variety.

Phonology

Vowels

Consonants

Accent
Stress generally falls on the penultimate syllable. The one exception is the vocative suffix (used by men) -é, which is added to the end of a word and is always stressed, e.g. Cuāuhtliquetzqui (a name, meaning "Eagle Warrior"), but Cuāuhtliquetzqué "O Cuauhtliquetzqui!"

When women use the vocative, the stress is shifted to the final syllable without adding any suffix. Oquichtli means "man", and oquichtlí means "O man!"

Phonotactics
Maximally complex Nahuatl syllables are of the form CVC;
that is, there can be at most one consonant at the beginning and end of every syllable. In contrast, English, for example, allows up to three consonants syllable-initially and up to four  consonants to occur at the end of syllables (e.g. strengths) (ngths = ).
Consonant clusters are only allowed word-medially, Nahuatl uses processes of both epenthesis (usually of ) and deletion to deal with this constraint.

For such purposes, tl , like all other affricates, is treated as a single sound, and not all consonants can occur in both syllable-initial and syllable-final position.

Likewise,  is also devoiced and merged into  in syllable-final position.

Grammar

Writing system

At the time of the Spanish conquest, Aztec writing used mostly pictograms supplemented with a few ideograms. When needed, it also used syllabic equivalences; Diego Durán recorded how the tlacuilos could render a prayer in Latin using this system but it was difficult to use. The writing system was adequate for keeping such records as genealogies, astronomical information, and tribute lists, but it could not represent a full vocabulary of spoken language in the way that the writing systems of the Old World or the Maya civilization's script could.

The Spanish introduced the Latin script, which was then used to record a large body of Aztec prose and poetry, which somewhat diminished the devastating loss caused by the burning of thousands of Aztec codices by the Spanish authorities.

Literature
Nahuatl literature is extensive (probably the most extensive of all Indigenous languages of the Americas), including a relatively large corpus of poetry (see also Nezahualcoyotl). The Huei tlamahuiçoltica is an early sample of literary Nahuatl.

A bilingual dictionary with Spanish, Vocabulario manual de las lenguas castellana y mexicana, was first published in 1611 and is "the most important and most frequently reprinted Spanish work on Nahuatl," according to the World Digital Library.

Now, Classical Nahuatl is used by black metal groups of Mexico supporting indigenismo, such as Kukulcan, Tlateotocani and Comando de Exterminio.

See also

 Aztec codices
 List of extinct languages of North America
 Mesoamerican language area

References

Sources

 
 
 Arenas, Pedro de: Vocabulario manual de las lenguas castellana y mexicana. [1611] Reprint: México 1982
 
 
 Carochi, Horacio: Arte de la lengua mexicana: con la declaración de los adverbios della. [1645] Reprint: Porrúa México 1983
 Curl, John: Ancient American Poets. Tempe AZ: Bilingual Press, 2005.
 Garibay, Angel Maria : Llave de Náhuatl. México 19??
 Garibay, Angel María, Historia de la literatura náhuatl. México 1953
 Garibay, Angel María, Poesía náhuatl. vol 1-3 México 1964
 
 Humboldt, Wilhelm von (1767-1835): Mexicanische Grammatik. Paderborn/München 1994
 Karttunen, Frances, An analytical dictionary of Nahuatl. Norman 1992
 Karttunen, Frances, Nahuatl in the Middle Years: Language Contact Phenomena in Texts of the Colonial Period. Los Angeles 1976
 Launey, Michel : Introduction à la langue et à la littérature aztèques. Paris 1980
 Launey, Michel : Introducción a la lengua y a la literatura Náhuatl. UNAM, México 1992
 
 León-Portilla, Ascensión H. de : Tepuztlahcuilolli, Impresos en Nahuatl: Historia y Bibliografia. Vol. 1–2. México 1988
 León-Portilla, Miguel : Literaturas Indígenas de México. Madrid 1992
 Lockhart, James (ed): We people here. Nahuatl Accounts of the conquest of Mexico. Los Angeles 1993
 Molina, Fray Alonso de: Vocabulario en Lengua Castellana y Mexicana y Mexicana y Castellana . [1555] Reprint: Porrúa México 1992
 Olmos, Fray Andrés de: Arte de la lengua mexicana concluído en el convento de San Andrés de Ueytlalpan, en la provincia de Totonacapan que es en la Nueva España. [1547] Reprint: México 1993
 Rincón, Antonio del : Arte mexicana compuesta por el padre Antonio del Rincón. [1595] Reprint: México 1885
 Sahagún, Fray Bernardino de (1499-1590): Florentine Codex. General History of the Things of New Spain (Historia General de las Cosas de la Nueva España). Eds Charles Dibble/Arthr Anderson, vol I-XII Santa Fe 1950-71
 Siméon, Rémi: Dictionnaire de la Langue Nahuatl ou Mexicaine. [Paris 1885] Reprint: Graz 1963
 Siméon, Rémi: Diccionario dße la Lengua Nahuatl o Mexicana. [Paris 1885] Reprint: México 2001
 Sullivan, Thelma D. : Compendium of Nahuatl Grammar. Salt Lake City 1988
 The Nahua Newsletter: edited by the Center for Latin American and Caribbean Studies of the Indiana University (Chief Editor Alan Sandstrom)
 Estudios de Cultura Nahuatl: special interest-yearbook of the Instituto de Investigaciones Historicas (IIH) of the Universidad Autonoma de México (UNAM), Ed.: Miguel Leon Portilla

External links